This is a list of newspapers currently published in Svalbard.  All of the listed newspapers are based in the capital, Longyearbyen.

Weekly
Svalbardposten – Norwegian
Icepeople – English

Official
 Press releases from the Governor of Svalbard – available in English, Norwegian, and Russian

News websites
 Spitsbergen News and Stories – available in English, Norwegian, and German

See also
 List of newspapers

References

External links

Svalbard
Mass media in Svalbard
newspapers